Highway 685 is a highway in the Canadian province of Saskatchewan. It runs from Highway 16 near Borden to Highway 340.

Highway 685 is entirely unpaved.

Major attractions 
Highway 685 crosses the Marshy Creek twice, at km 27 and again at km 35.
Near its intersection with Highway 781, Highway 685 is just beside the Redberry Lake Regional Park.

Intersections from south to north

See also 
Roads in Saskatchewan
Transport in Saskatchewan

References 

 

685